Ruta Šaca-Marjaša (born Ruta Maksovna Shats-Mariash; , 4 February 1927 – 29 November 2016)  was a Jewish Latvian lawyer, writer, poet, and politician, a former Deputy of the Latvian Parliament of 5th (1995) and 6th (1998) convocations. She lived in Riga.

She was awarded the Order of the Three Stars of IV (1995) and III (2000) degrees.

References

Sources
 Ruta Shats-Mariash, Caleidoscope of My Memory (Рута Шац-Марьяш, Калейдоскоп моей памяти) - Rīga : Acis, 2003;  

1927 births
2016 deaths
Lawyers from Riga
Latvian Jews
Latvian Way politicians
Deputies of the Supreme Council of the Republic of Latvia
Deputies of the 5th Saeima
Deputies of the 6th Saeima
Members of the European Commission against Racism and Intolerance
Women deputies of the Saeima
20th-century Latvian women politicians
21st-century Latvian women politicians
Politicians from Riga
20th-century Latvian lawyers
Latvian women lawyers